Németkér is a village in Tolna County, Hungary. It is located at about 100 km south of Budapest. It belongs to the small area Paks.

Németkér was founded in 1785 by the Abbey Földvár and German settlers (so-called Donauschwaben) colonized, who had followed the call of the Habsburg monarchy, to settle the land after the completion of the Turkish wars.

After the end of the Second World War, the Danube Swabians were resettled in the American occupation zone of Germany.

Notable people 
 Stefan Reisch - A football player

Populated places in Tolna County